Bayirbucak is a region in the Latakia District of the Latakia Governorate in northwestern Syria. There is a considerable Syrian Turkmen presence in the area have strong cultural and historical ties with Turkey.

Bayirbucak's most distinctive mountain is Turkmen Mountain (Jabal Turkman)

Etymology
Bayirbucak is a Turkish exonym, and not the official name for the region, which is Al-Rabiaa subdistrict. The word Bayırbucak comes from two different words in Turkish: bayır (en: hillside) and bucak (en: district). According to Ottoman archival documents, Bayir was the official name of the district (nahiye) in the Ottoman period.

Notable events
On 24 November 2015, two Turkish F-16s shot down one of two Russian Su-24 fighter jets, which violated Turkish airspace while in an operation to attack militia in Bayirbucak. One Russian pilot was killed by Turkmen forces.

Russian aerial bombardments during the 2015–16 Latakia offensive resulted in a very difficult situation in the Bayirbucak Turkmen regions, causing almost all Turkmens to flee the region to Turkey.

References

Latakia District
Geography of Syria
Turkmen communities in Syria
Turkish-speaking territories in Syria